The 2008 Detroit Indy Grand Prix presented by Firestone was an IndyCar Series race that was held on August 31, 2008 on the Raceway on Belle Isle in Detroit, Michigan. It was the sixteenth race of the 2008 IndyCar Series season. Originally scheduled to run over 90 laps, it was shortened to 87 laps due to 2-hour limit. The race was won by Justin Wilson for the Newman/Haas/Lanigan Racing team. Hélio Castroneves finished second, and Tony Kanaan clinched third. Wilson dedicated his win to actor Paul Newman, the ailing joint-owner of his team; Newman died less than a month later.

Scott Dixon claimed pole position for the race, and led through the first lap. Dixon and Castroneves, who had qualified second, pulled away from the pack, until the seventeenth lap, when a full-track caution was issued after an incident between Dan Wheldon and Jamie Camara. Dixon pitted under the yellow, but did so alone, granting the lead to Castroneves. The Brazilian led the race until lap 72, other than a single lap during which Oriol Servià was leading during pit stops. Late in the race, Wilson was challenging for the lead, and Castroneves was judged to have blocked the other driver, resulting in a penalty which allowed Wilson to take the lead. Despite a late push by Castroneves to pass Wilson, the rookie British driver maintained his position to claim victory.

There were four cautions, totalling 11 laps during the race. It was Wilson's first career IndyCar win. Of the 25 drivers that started, 18 completed the race, three retired after contact, one retired with handling problems and three retired due to mechanical issues.

Classification

Race results

Standings after the race
Drivers' Championship

References

Detroit Indy Grand Prix
Detroit Indy Grand Prix
2008 in Detroit
August 2008 sports events in the United States